The April 28–29 events were organised by university students to support university lecturers  and protest against the repressive policies of the Democrat Party (DP) on April 28, 1960 in Istanbul and on April 29, 1960 in Ankara. Two students lost their lives after the police opened fire on them, and around 100 people were injured, among them Istanbul University rector Sıddık Sami Onar while many academics were beaten by the police. About a month after the demonstrations, the National Unity Committee overthrew the Democrat Party government in the 1960 Turkish coup d'état.

Background
The policies followed by the Democratic Party after 1959 were starting to cause economic and political problems. These created new tensions between political leaders and the military hierarchy, of concern to both university students and intellectual circles. Immediately before these disturbances, on April 27, 1960, the Democrat Party under Adnan Menderes held a vote in parliament to establish a Committee of Inquest to investigate government claims that the opposition Republican People's Party (CHP) was inciting rebellion. In parliament both CHP and some DP deputies voted against the establishment of the Committee, but the majority voted for it on 28 April 1960. With the enactment of this law, the political atmosphere became even more tense. The National Unity Committee composed of low-ranking officers in the Turkish Armed Forces who were against the government became more determined to stage a coup, while university students protested against the "repressive" laws enacted by the government.

Events
On April 28, 1960, university students gathered in the central building of Istanbul University shouting “Down with the dictators!” and “We want freedom!” The security forces surrounding the protesting students opened fire to disperse them and :tr:Turan Emeksiz, a student of the Faculty of Forestry, was shot dead. Other students in the area were also beaten by the police and dragged along the ground by police cars. Istanbul University rector Onar, who had asked the academics and police to leave the campus, was beaten by the police. The events that started in the garden of the university then spread to Beyazıt Square. As the turmoil between the police and the students got out of hand, army units were called for reinforcement. Seeing the soldiers, the students began to chant long live the Turkish army, we are with the army. Then the soldiers and the students embraced each other, and there was no clash between the soldiers and the students. Most of the university students arrested by the police and handed over to the soldiers to be taken to the Davut Pasha Barracks were released by the soldiers. Only 40 students were taken to the barracks, where the soldiers played football with them.

The events of April 28 are known as ‘Bloody Thursday’. Due to the events, Istanbul University was closed for 15 days. Istanbul was placed under curfew, martial law was declared, and newspapers were banned from publishing. The next day, on April 29, the students continued their protests.  At Sultanahmet Square on April 30, a student from Istanbul High School, Nedim Özpolat, was hit and killed by police gunfire.

The protests that started in Istanbul on April 28 spread to Ankara on April 29. Protests against the government were started by students at Ankara University Law School. Clashes broke out between students and the police. Security forces opened fire on students at the Faculty of Political Sciences and martial law was declared in Ankara.

Aftermath
The 28–29 April Incidents were the most important and largest student protest ever seen in Turkey. 
One week later, the first Turkish civil disobedience action, the 555k protests (held at 5 o'clock on the fifth of May), took place in Kızılay, Ankara.

References

1960 in Turkey
1960s in Turkish politics
Protests in Turkey